Death Row Records is an American record label that was founded in 1991 by The D.O.C., Dr. Dre, Suge Knight, and Dick Griffey. The label became a sensation by releasing multi-platinum hip-hop albums by West Coast-based artists such as Dr. Dre (The Chronic), Snoop Dogg (Doggystyle, Tha Doggfather), Tha Dogg Pound (Dogg Food), and 2Pac (All Eyez on Me, The Don Killuminati: The 7 Day Theory) during the 1990s. At its peak, Death Row was making over US$100 million a year.

By the late 1990s, the label began to decline after the death of its star artist, 2Pac, imprisonment of Suge Knight, and the departures of Dr. Dre and Snoop Dogg. Although Death Row was enjoying financial success, it was embroiled in controversies, lawsuits, and violence by its artists and associates.

Death Row Records filed for bankruptcy in 2006 and was auctioned to WIDEawake Entertainment for $18 million on January 15, 2009. The owner of WIDEawake bankrupted in 2012 and the label was then sold to Entertainment One, then became a division of Hasbro until April 2021 when eOne Music was sold to The Blackstone Group. Snoop Dogg bought Death Row from MNRK Music Group in February 2022, intending to revive the label.

History

Dr. Dre years: first generation

In 1987, N.W.A's Dr. Dre signed to Eazy-E's Ruthless Records. As head of production at the label, Dr. Dre produced a large number of Ruthless projects, many of them successful; feeling the pressures of having to produce so many acts and feeling he was underpaid, Dr. Dre became frustrated with Ruthless. After the departure of Ice Cube in 1989 over financial disagreements with Jerry Heller, Suge Knight and the D.O.C. went over the books with a lawyer. Convinced that Jerry Heller and Eazy-E were dishonest, they approached Dr. Dre about forming a label with them, away from Heller and Eazy-E. Allegedly using strong-arm tactics, Suge Knight was able to procure contracts from Eazy-E for the D.O.C., Dr. Dre and Michel'le.

Dr. Dre and Suge Knight along with partners the D.O.C. and Dick Griffey began the process of starting a record label and music partnership in anticipation of Dr. Dre's departure from Ruthless. Although the name of their new music venture was originally called Future Shock, the D.O.C. claimed to have suggested changing the name of the new label to 'Def Row'  (a play on the Def Jam), but rights to the name were already owned by the Unknown DJ, who also happened to be one of Dre's former music associates in the 1980s. Unknown stated in an interview that he created the name "Def Row" for a potential deal to start another record label under Morgan Creek. However he later sold the naming rights to Dr. Dre and his partners in July 1991 and by 1992 the name changed to its eventual title of Death Row Records. Knight approached Michael "Harry-O" Harris, a businessman imprisoned on drug and attempted murder charges. Through David Kenner, an attorney handling Harris's appeal, Harry-O set up Godfather Entertainment, a parent company for the newly christened Death Row.

Knight approached Vanilla Ice (Robert Van Winkle), using management connections with Mario "Chocolate" Johnson, claiming Johnson had produced and co-written the song "Ice Ice Baby", and had not received royalties for it. After consulting with Alex Roberts, Knight and two bodyguards arrived at The Palm in West Hollywood, Los Angeles, California, where Van Winkle was eating. After shoving Van Winkle's bodyguards aside, Knight sat down in front of Van Winkle, staring at him before asking "How you doin'?" Similar incidents were repeated on several occasions, including alleged attempts to lure Vanilla Ice into a van filled with Bloods and Crips, before Knight showed up at Vanilla Ice's hotel suite on the 15th floor of the Bel Age Hotel, accompanied by Johnson and a member of the Los Angeles Raiders. According to Vanilla Ice, Knight took him out on the balcony by himself, and implied he would throw Vanilla Ice off unless he signed the rights to the song over to Knight; Van Winkle's money helped fund Death Row. Death Row was initially located at the intersection of Westwood Blvd and Wilshire Blvd, later to be relocated to the intersection of Wilshire Blvd. and San Vicente Blvd.

The Chronic

With the help of Kenner, Knight began signing young, inner-city California-based artists and arranged for Death Row Records to handle the soundtrack for the 1992 film, Deep Cover. The single, "Deep Cover", established Dr. Dre as a solo artist and a young Snoop Doggy Dogg as his protégé. Work soon began on The Chronic, Dr. Dre's debut solo album, which heavily featured Snoop and the rest of the label's core roster.

The album, which peaked at number 3 on the Billboard Top 200, went on to sell 5.7 million records worldwide, establishing the West Coast in the hip-hop industry and popularizing the distinctive style of G-Funk. The Death Row roster consisted of Dre, Snoop, Daz, Kurupt, Nate Dogg, Lady of Rage, the D.O.C., RBX, and many more. Later on, Death Row artist Lil 1/2 Dead's contract was later sold to Priority Records where he released his debut album The Dead Has Arisen.

Doggystyle

After finding solo success, Dre began producing Snoop Dogg's debut album Doggystyle; the process took two years. Snoop's debut was released in 1993 due to public demand and high pressure from retailers. Though unfinished, it outperformed The Chronic at Quadruple Platinum, and garnered similarly glowing reviews. Soon after the release of the album, Snoop Dogg was charged with murder, fueling the debate that politicians C. Delores Tucker and vice presidential candidate Dan Quayle sparked  by criticizing gangsta rap for being against American values, degrading to black women, and encouraging violence towards police officers.

Death Row Thanksgiving
On November 22, 1994, at the offices of The Brotherhood Crusade in Los Angeles, Suge Knight and several artists from Death Row such as Tha Dogg Pound as well as DJ Quik distributed nearly 2,000 turkeys to the public. Death Row also donated turkeys the following year as well.

Murder of Kelly Jamerson 

On March 13, 1995, Death Row Records hosted a private party at the El Rey Theatre, where Kelly Jamerson, a Rolling 60's Crip, was severely beaten by several Bloods, who were allegedly from Suge Knight's inner circle. As a result of his injuries, Jamerson died the next day at the Cedars-Sinai Medical Center.

Signing 2Pac, Bad Boy Records feud and Dr. Dre's departure 
After an August visit to see 2Pac at Clinton Correctional Facility in northern New York state, Suge traveled southward to New York City to join Death Row's entourage to the 2nd Annual Source Awards ceremony. Already reputed for strongarm tactics on the Los Angeles rap scene, Suge used his brief stage time mainly to disparage Sean "Puff Daddy" Combs, boss of Bad Boy Entertainment, the label then leading New York rap scene. Knight criticized Combs for his habit of ad-libbing on his artists' music as well as making numerous cameo appearances in his artists' music videos. Before closing with a brief comment of support for Shakur, Suge invited artists seeking the spotlight for themselves to join Death Row. Eventually, Puff recalled that to preempt severe retaliation from his Bad Boy crew, he had promptly confronted Suge, whose reply—that he had meant Jermaine Dupri, of So So Def Recordings, in Atlanta—was politic enough to deescalate the conflict.

Still, among the fans, the previously diffuse rivalry between America's two mainstream rap scenes had instantly flared already. And while in New York, Suge visited Uptown Records, where Puff, under its founder Andre Harrell, had started in the music business through an internship. Apparently without paying Uptown, Suge obtained the releases of Puff's prime Uptown recruits Jodeci, its producer DeVante Swing, and Mary J. Blige, all then signing with Suge's management company.

On September 24, 1995, the night Suge Knight slapped Sean "Puffy" Combs, at a party for Jermaine Dupri Birthday in Atlanta at the Platinum House nightclub, Bad Boy Records Entourage entered a heated dispute with Suge and Suge's friend Jai Hassan-Jamal "Big Jake" Robles, a Bloods gang member and Death Row bodyguard. According to eyewitnesses, including a Fulton County sheriff, working there as a nightclub bouncer, Puff had heatedly disputed with Suge inside the club, whereas several minutes later, outside the club, it was Puff's childhood friend and own bodyguard, Anthony "Wolf" Jones, who aimed a gun at Big Jake who was fatally shot while entering a Limousine.

The attorneys of Puff and his bodyguard both denied any involvement by their clients, while Puff's lawyer added that Puff had not even been with his bodyguard that night. Over 20 years later, the case remains officially unresolved. Yet immediately and persistently, Suge blamed Puff, cementing the enmity between the two bosses, whose two record labels dominated the rap genre's two mainstream centers.

In October 1995, Knight visited 2Pac in prison again and posted $1.4 million bond. 2Pac began work on his Death Row album, kicking off his tenure by insulting the Notorious B.I.G., Junior M.A.F.I.A. and Puff Daddy (the founder of Bad Boy Records), whom he accused of setting him up to be robbed and shot at Quad Studios on November 30, 1994, as well as Mobb Deep, Jay-Z, A Tribe Called Quest, De La Soul, Jimmy Henchman, the Fugees and Nas. Tha Dogg Pound's debut album, Dogg Food, continued the label's streak of commercial successes; its members – rappers Kurupt and Daz Dillinger – then joined Snoop in ridiculing New York rappers with their single "New York, New York", featuring Snoop Dogg. The video, set in New York City, New York, was also heightened when the set was fired upon in a drive-by. After the shooting, Snoop Dogg and Tha Dogg Pound filmed scenes kicking down a building in New York. The single provoked a response called '"L.A., L.A." by East Coast rappers Capone-N-Noreaga, Tragedy Khadafi, and Mobb Deep.

Another report was that Sam Sneed was beaten in one of the label's meetings by a group of Death Row affiliates, led by Suge Knight and 2Pac. According to Daz Dillinger, the reason this happened was that Sam Sneed had too many East Coast rappers in his "Lady Heroin" music video. Disillusioned with the direction of Death Row, artists RBX and the D.O.C. chose to leave, after which Suge Knight exercised tighter control over the rest of the roster. Dogg Food was not produced by Dr. Dre but was mixed by Dr. Dre, a further testament to Dre's dwindling involvement with Death Row. Dr. Dre also grew tired of Knight's violence within the label, although he contributed toward two tracks on 2Pac's All Eyez on Me. The rest of the tracks on the album, however, were mostly produced by Daz Dillinger and Johnny J, despite Dr. Dre being nominally titled as Executive Producer. 2Pac's behavior reportedly became erratic as he continued his verbal wars with the Notorious B.I.G., Bad Boy Records, Puff Daddy, Mobb Deep, and Prodigy, including many violent confrontations with many of those rappers at some points. On March 22, 1996, due to the infighting, Dr. Dre officially left Death Row Records to found Aftermath, which provoked 2Pac to turn against Dr. Dre.

MC Hammer's involvement and departure
Suge Knight's relationship with MC Hammer dates back to 1988. With the success of Hammer's 1994 album, The Funky Headhunter, Hammer signed with Death Row in 1995, along with his close friend, Tupac. The label did not release the album of M.C. Hammer's music (titled Too Tight), although he did release versions of some tracks on his next album. However, Hammer did record tracks with Shakur and others, most notably the song "Too Late Playa" (along with Big Daddy Kane and Danny Boy). After the death of Tupac in 1996, MC Hammer left the label.

Tupac Shakur's murder and Suge Knight's incarceration

Formerly a united front of artists, Death Row's roster fractured into separate camps. Daz, now head producer, worked on Snoop Dogg's second album Tha Doggfather, which featured Bad Azz and Techniec of his LBC Crew, Warren G and Nate Dogg of his group 213 and Tha Dogg Pound. 2Pac shut himself into the studio with Hurt-M-Badd and Big "D", crafting The Don Killuminati: The 7 Day Theory - unlike All Eyez on Me, it was devoid of high-profile Death Row guest appearances, instead showcasing The Outlawz and Bad Azz, and had a much darker tone. Suge Knight was now barely reachable by his staff, and employees were assaulted as punishment for not following orders.

During a trip to Las Vegas, Nevada, for a Mike Tyson boxing match, 2Pac was interviewed on the possibility of  Death Row East, an East Coast branch of Death Row. It was also during this time that Alex Roberts and David Kenner had been seen at Suge Knight's Vegas Club 662, in discussion about the possibility of having Roberts' New York underworld connections help pave the way for Death Row East. Though names from Big Daddy Kane and The Wu-Tang Clan to Eric B. and Craig Mack were mentioned, the label never formed; On September 7, 1996, Suge Knight and 2Pac were caught on surveillance camera at the MGM Grand Hotel in Las Vegas attacking gang member Orlando Anderson, who was a member of the Southside Compton Crips street gang. Later that night, 2Pac was shot four times in a drive-by shooting in the front seat of Suge Knight's BMW 750iL waiting at a red traffic light at crossroads; en route to Knight's Las Vegas Club 662; despite living six days in critical condition, 2Pac died on September 13, 1996. He was 25 years old.

2Pac's "The Don Killuminati: 7 Day Theory" was released in November 1996, just one week before Snoop Dogg's "Tha Doggfather". Both albums achieved Multi-Platinum sales. On February 28, 1997, Suge Knight was convicted of parole violation and sentenced to nine years in prison, causing Interscope to drop their distribution deal with the label. Suge Knight's control over the label diminished, as Nate Dogg was able to leave, followed by Snoop Dogg and Kurupt. After the release of her solo album Necessary Roughness, The Lady of Rage left. Daz Dillinger departed in 1999 after the release of his debut album Retaliation, Revenge and Get Back, but produced for Big C-Style, and he later formed Dogg Pound Records. Kurupt returned to the label in early 2002 upon Suge Knight's release from prison on August 6, 2001.

Death Row Records UK
In 2001, Knight decided to enter the UK market with Death Row Records operating as an independent record label in conjunction with the Ritz Music Group, a company known for its success with Irish country music artists such as Daniel O'Donnell The joint-venture signed British R&B singer Mark Morrison to a five-year deal with Death Row Records UK, with a single called "Thank God It's Friday" and an album called Innocent Man scheduled for a 2002 release. However, the single did not chart in the UK and the album ended up being released by footballer Kevin Campbell's record label 2 Wikid, before being re-issued in 2006 by Mona Records.

Second generation exodus (Tha Row Records)
Maintaining artistic control from behind bars, Suge Knight launched smear campaigns against his former artists, most notably Snoop Dogg, death threats were exchanged, and Snoop Dogg responded by publicly dissing Suge Knight, leaving the label, and later releasing a diss track named "Pimp Slapp'd", critically acclaimed by music magazine Complex. The label supported itself with releases pulled from vaults—most successfully various posthumous 2Pac albums, along with Dr. Dre and Snoop Dogg re-releases and then-unreleased compilation records such as Suge Knight Represents: Chronic 2000. He signed new talent, including Crooked I who had been lighting up the Californian underground with his rhyming ability, particularly the Wake Up Show with Sway & King Tech. 

Despite bad blood, Kurupt would again sign with Suge Knight in exchange for the position of Vice President, which sparked a feud between himself and Daz Dillinger and Snoop Dogg. He began work on Against tha Grain; his verbal feud with his former partners continued from 2002 to 2005. Left Eye, member of the R&B girl group TLC signed with Death Row after finishing her solo deal with Arista who released her first album Supernova in 2001. At this time, Death Row changed into Tha Row Records. Lopes joined to record a second solo album under the pseudonym N.I.N.A. (New Identity Not Applicable), while also working on TLC's new album 3D. N.I.N.A. was canceled after her death in April 2002. The album was leaked online in 2011.

After promoting his new talent from prison, directing a campaign against his former artists and exacerbating the conflict between Daz Dillinger, Snoop Dogg and Kurupt, Suge had still yet to release any albums by his new artists. After Kurupt's second departure, Against tha Grain was released; soon after, citing dissatisfaction with serving five years on the label and seeing no release, Rapper Crooked I left Death Row, eventually filing a gag order on Knight to prevent him from interfering with him finding a new deal. Petey Pablo, who had signed in 2005 and started the never-released album Same Eyez on Me, left along with rapper Tha Realest in 2006.

Bankruptcy
On April 4, 2006, both Death Row Records and Suge Knight simultaneously filed for Chapter 11 bankruptcy protection following the appointment of a Receiver to acquire and auction off assets of both Death Row Records and Suge Knight in the civil case filed by Lydia Harris against Suge Knight. Among those listed as unsecured creditors to Death Row include the Harrises ($107 million), the Internal Revenue Service ($6.9 million), Koch Records ($3.4 million), Interscope Records ($2.5 million) and a number of artists previously signed to the label. Suge Knight eventually lost control of Death Row Records and his personal assets when Chapter 11 Trustees took over both cases.

Ownership changes 
WIDEawake Entertainment Group was created in 2006 by Lara Lavi.

On January 15, 2009, Death Row Records was successfully auctioned to entertainment development company WIDEawake for US$18 million. WIDEawake Entertainment made a leveraged purchase of Death Row Records in part thanks to financing provided by New Solutions Financial Corporation. On January 25, 2009, an auction was held for everything found in Death Row's office after it filed for bankruptcy.

Both WIDEawake and New Solutions Financial were based in Toronto, Ontario, Canada. New Solutions by the end of 2009 began to squeeze Lara Lavi out of WIDEawake Entertainment by restricting her ability to access funds they had lent her for Deathrow. By November 2009 Lara Lavi was removed from WIDEawake entertainment and Robert Thomson of New Solution Financial had taken over day-to-day operations.  Lavi then sued her former company, Ontario-based WIDEawake Entertainment Group, New Solutions Financial Corporation and New Solutions Managing Director Robert Thompson in New York County Court on November 19, 2009. New Solutions Financial Corporation was eventually exposed as a Ponzi scheme.

Of note was the Death Row electric chair which went for US$2,500.

Since the acquisition, the company has continued to release material from its vast archives of materials acquired in the sale. Noteworthy releases include previously unreleased material from such artists as Snoop Dogg, Kurupt, Danny Boy, Crooked I, Sam Sneed, LBC Crew and O.F.T.B. Since the acquisition of the material, Death Row, under the management of WIDEawake, has made many positive steps towards improving the image of Death Row by making good on its promise to make royalty payments to many of the artists, producers, and songwriters with commercially released material under the label. On Record Store Day, April 18, 2012, the label issued a free Death Row "Record Store Day" CD sampler which included music from Petey Pablo and Danny Boy.

The Chronic Re-Lit was released on September 1, 2009. The album contained The Chronic re-mastered with seven bonus songs from the vault by Snoop Doggy Dogg, CPO, Kurupt, Jewell, plus a DVD containing music videos, a Dr. Dre interview, a Dr. Dre and Snoop Dogg mini movie, and 1992 television commercials for the original The Chronic release.

Snoop Doggy Dogg – Death Row The Lost Sessions Vol 1 was released October 13, 2009 and contains 15 previously unreleased tracks with four being produced by Dr. Dre.

Death Row The Ultimate Collection was released on November 24 and was a special box set containing three audio CDs (one greatest hits disc and two discs of unreleased content), one DVD of music videos which includes the unreleased Dr. Dre music video "Puffin' On Blunts" and a limited edition Death Row T-shirt. The set boasts over 20 unreleased tracks by Snoop Doggy Dogg, Tha Dogg Pound, the Lady of Rage, Lord Autopz and Petey Pablo. During this period, there was a distribution venture between Entertainment One, WIDEawake, and Death Row.

On December 10, 2012, New Solutions Financial Corp., the Canadian company that owned WIDEawake Death Row, had gone bankrupt and sold both the label and catalog to a publicly held company. In 2013, Entertainment One purchased the rights to the Death Row catalog. The Group invested £175 million in content rights and television programmes in the year (2012: £135.8 million) and £4.2 million ($6 million) to purchase the music library assets of Death Row. Death Row had a Pop-Up event in Los Angeles on April 10, 2019.

On August 23, 2019, American toy company Hasbro announced a $4 billion purchase of eOne, making them the owners of Death Row Records. In April 2021, Hasbro and Entertainment One announced it would sell-off eOne Music to The Blackstone Group. The acquisition was completed in June 2021.

Revival through Snoop Dogg and third generation 
On February 9, 2022, ahead of the release of his next album and his appearance in the Super Bowl LVI halftime show, Snoop Dogg announced that he would acquire the rights to the Death Row Records trademarks from MNRK Music Group (the renamed eOne Music). The sale did not immediately include rights to the label's catalog, but it was reported that he was nearing a deal to acquire the catalogs of himself and other Death Row artists from MNRK. On February 11, 2022, Snoop Dogg released his third studio album on Death Row Records, marking a 26-year lapse from the label.

Snoop Dogg's purchase of Death Row Records did not include the rights to Tupac or Dr. Dre's albums originally. On March 4, 2022, in an interview with Tidal, Snoop Dogg stated he acquired the rights to all the albums previously released on Death Row Records, including his debut studio album Doggystyle and Dr. Dre's The Chronic. Despite the interview, Dr. Dre's lawyer, Howard King, later refuted the "false reports" two days later, stating the rapper still retains total control of The Chronic, which came back to streaming services on February 1, 2023. On April 18, 2022, it was announced that Death Row Records would have its own streaming service, which pays higher royalties to its artists than main music streaming services.

In December of 2022, Snoop Dogg sold a stake of Death Row’s catalogue to former Apple Music’s Global Creative Director Larry Jackson’s gamma. music company. On February 12, 2023, Snoop Dogg announced that Death Row’s catalogue would return to TikTok via association with music distribution company SoundOn. Death Row’s catalogue returned to all music streaming services on March 9, 2023.

Notable artists

Current artists

Former artists

Discography

See also 
 Death Row Records artists

References

Further reading 
 Have Gun Will Travel: The Spectacular Rise and Violent Fall of Death Row Records, Ronin Ro, Doubleday, 1998, 384 pages, 
 Labyrinth: A Detective Investigates the Murders of Tupac Shakur and Notorious B.I.G., the Implications of Death Row Records' Suge by Randall Sullivan, Atlantic Monthly Press, April 2, 2002, 384 pages, 
 The Killing of Tupac Shakur, by Cathy Scott, Huntington Press, 2002 (2nd ed), 235 pages, 
 Welcome to Death Row, Director: S. Leigh Savidge & Jeff Scheftel, (Video) 2001

External links 
 Death Row Records – Official YouTube

 
American companies established in 1992
American companies disestablished in 2008
American independent record labels
Gangsta rap record labels
Hip hop record labels
Record labels based in California
Vanity record labels
Record labels established in 1992
Record labels disestablished in 2008
1992 establishments in California
2008 disestablishments in California
Defunct companies based in Greater Los Angeles
Dr. Dre
Tupac Shakur
MNRK Music Group
Obscenity controversies in music